Chain Kulii Ki Main Kulii is a 2007 Hindi-language Indian fantasy sports comedy film directed by Karanjeet Saluja (also known as Kittu Saluja). It stars Zain Khan and Rahul Bose.  The film features music by Salim–Sulaiman and lyrics by Irfan Siddiqui. Cricketer Kapil Dev also makes a cameo appearance in the film.

Plot 
Karan is a thirteen-year-old boy who lives in a dilapidated orphanage owned by a stern, uncouth warden, John "Hitler" Kakkad. Karan has two dreams: one is to have parents and the other is to be a big cricketer. His inspiration is Kapil Dev, since he has been brought up being motivated by his skills. 
His dreams take a turn when one day, he lays his hands on an old cricket bat which Karan is convinced is the bat that Kapil Dev used to win the 1983 World Cup; for him, the bat becomes a magic bat. One day by a stroke of luck, the coach of the Indian cricket team spots Karan playing cricket and is highly impressed by his batting skills. At that point in time, the Indian cricket team has been going through a "rough patch".

Karan and his magical bat are inducted into the Indian cricket team as the opening batsman along with the captain, Varun. When Karan marches onto the pitch and wins the match for India, he soon becomes the nation's heartthrob. Although he was formerly rejected by adopting couples, he is now the most sought after kid in the country. However, Raghav, the orphanage bully, hates him and feels that if Karan did not have the magic bat he would have never made it to the cricket team. Raghav now wants the magic bat at any cost. Karan and Varun develop a strong emotional bond deeper than fellow cricketers. Karan has no parents and Varun has parents, but is estranged with his father and does not want to accept him. Karan strongly believes that parents are the best gift endowed by God and succeeds in uniting Varun with his father.

At the final 5th one day match between India and Pakistan, events spiral out of control and Karan's magic bat is destroyed by Raghav. Karan is a nervous wreck, but Varun makes him realise that the bat was in fact just an ordinary bat, and it was a mere coincidence that two players viz. Karan and Kapil Dev who used that bat were both incredibly talented batsmen. Karan could get the magic back forever, if he places faith in himself instead of the bat. With Karan's help, India wins the match. After the match, Karan decides to stop playing and re-join the team when he is older. Varun and his girlfriend whom he marries, Malini supposedly decide to adopt Karan, who decides that he will join cricket coaching after his finishing his education and will join the Indian team back.

Cast
 Zain Khan as Karan
Rahul Bose as Varun Roy
Meera Vasudevan as Malini
 Nassar Abdulla as Mr. Roy, Varun's father
Rajesh Khera as John Kakkad
Girish Karnad as Indian Cricket Team coach
 Deiptimaan Chowdhury as Dabboo 
 Raj Bhansali as Raghav
Sushil Parashar as Bholu Dada
Kapil Dev as himself (cameo)
 Nasirr Khan as Commentator (spl app)
 Kunal Ganjawala as himself in song "Chain Kulii Ki Main Kulii"

Music

Reception

Box office
Chain Kulii Ki Main Kulii failed to get a good response at the box office. The film released after schools had re-opened, which resulted in collections in single digits, earning Rs. 890,000 in its opening week. In India it grossed Rs. 6.4 million.

Critical response
Khalid Mohamed of Hindustan Times gave the film 2 out of 5 stars, describing it as "tedious and requiring total suspension of disbelief". Rajeev Masand gave the film 2.5 out of 5 stars, calling it "an honorable attempt and a film you wouldn’t be embarrassed to take your children to". Taran Adarsh od Bollywood Hungama gave the film 1.5 out of 5 stars, writing "On the whole, CHAIN KULII KI MAIN KULII is an ordinary fare that might attract kids in its opening weekend. But the three tough oppositions next week will marginalize it completely." Rediff.com's Patcy N., however, complimented it as a watchable and "cute film". She gave the film 2.5 out of 5 stars, writing ″Though the orphanage angle is copied from Annie and Great Expectations, the cricket angle adds newness to the film. All in all, not a bad movie.″

References

2007 films
Indian children's films
Films about cricket in India
Films scored by Salim–Sulaiman
2000s Hindi-language films